Steve Korte (born January 15, 1960) is a former American football player.  He played professionally as a center and an offensive guard in the National Football League (NFL) with the New Orleans Saints, from 1983 to 1990. He scored one touchdown from a fumble recovery.

Korte played college football at the University of Arkansas.  He was a consensus All-American in 1982 at guard.  He bench pressed 585 pounds, making him one of the strongest football players in Arkansas Razorbacks football history. In 2015 Korte was inducted into the Arkansas Sports Hall of Honor.

Korte's son, Steven Korte, played fullback for the LSU Tigers football team and was signed by the Green Bay Packers in 2008 but did not play.

References

External links
 

1960 births
Living people
American football centers
American football offensive guards
Arkansas Razorbacks football players
New Orleans Saints players
All-American college football players
Sportspeople from Littleton, Colorado
Players of American football from Denver